is a Japanese retired footballer and assistant manager of Sagan Tosu from 2023.

Career

Club
Ogawa was released by Nagoya Grampus after 10 years with the club on 10 November 2016 following the club's relegation to J2 League.

Manager
After retiring at the end of 2019, Ogawa was appointed head coach of TIAMO Hirakata on 17 January 2020.

On 26 September 2022, Ogawa left from the club after 7 months at Tiamo Hirakata.

On 1 December 2022, He appointment assistant manager of J1 club, Sagan Tosu from 2023.

Career statistics

Club
Updated to end of 2019 season.

Honours
 Club
J. League Division 1 - 2010
Japanese Super Cup - 2011

 Individual
J. League Rookie of the Year - 2008
J. League Best Eleven - 2008

References

External links
Profile at Albirex Niigata
Profile at Nagoya Grampus

1984 births
Living people
Meiji University alumni
Association football people from Tokyo
Japanese footballers
J1 League players
J2 League players
Nagoya Grampus players
Sagan Tosu players
Albirex Niigata players
Association football midfielders
Japanese football managers